Kalle Talviste (born 17 April 1945) is an Estonian agronomist and politician. From 1991 until 2003, he was the Rapla County governor. He was a member of X Riigikogu.

References

Living people
1945 births
Estonian agronomists
Estonian Centre Party politicians
Members of the Riigikogu, 2003–2007
Place of birth missing (living people)
Estonian University of Life Sciences alumni